Allium spirale, also known as Korean aging chive, is a plant species native to Korea, Primorye, and parts of China. It is cultivated in many other regions and has for some reason obtained the common name German garlic. Other common names include spiral onion, corkscrew onion, and curly chives.

Allium spirale forms a cluster of narrow bulbs up to 15 mm in diameter. Scape is up to 40 cm tall. Leaves are flat, long and narrow, shorter than the scape but only about 5 mm across, generally twisted in a helical fashion. Umbel is hemispheric, densely crowded with many flowers. Tepals pink with a dark red midvein. It

Habitat
Allium spirale typically grows on dry slopes, loess, steppes, and places with significant amounts of sand, gravel or stone.

References

spirale
Onions
Flora of Eastern Asia
Flora of the Russian Far East
Flora of China
Plants described in 1814